Pink domino may refer to:
 Pink Domino (short story), a novel by Georgette Heyer
 a mullein (plants in the genus Verbascum) cultivar
 The Pink Dominos, a farce in three acts by James Albery